Tien Lei (born June 1, 1983 in Kaohsiung) is a Taiwanese professional basketball player.

Considered one of the most talented offensive players in Taiwan, Tien has won multiple scoring and rebounding champions of the Super Basketball League (SBL) there, while helping his team, the Dacin Tigers, to its first championship title in franchise history in 2009.  He also appeared in the NBA Summer League in 2005.

Since his national team debut at the FIBA Asia Championship 2001, Tien has served as starting power forward for the Chinese Taipei men's national basketball team. In addition to his ability to make long-range shots, Tien has also been the most efficient rebounder on the Taiwanese team in international tournaments—owing much to his jumping ability. At the 2009 FIBA Asia Championship, he helped Chinese Taipei to a fifth-place finish, the team's best record in the tournament since the turn of the century, while averaging 10.6 points and 5.8 rebounds per game. He was thus named to the All-Tournament Third Team.

Despite the progress made by his teams in recent years, nonetheless, Tien's ability to rebound and make inside plays has been compromised by a fatigue fracture in his left tibia since 2007.

On March 15, 2021, Tien announced that the 2020-2021 season will be his last season before retirement.

On April 4, Tien played his last game and officially announced his retirement.

References 

1983 births
Living people
Sportspeople from Kaohsiung
Taiwanese men's basketball players
Basketball players at the 2002 Asian Games
Basketball players at the 2006 Asian Games
Basketball players at the 2010 Asian Games
Basketball players at the 2014 Asian Games
Small forwards
Power forwards (basketball)
Tianjin Pioneers players
Taiwanese expatriate basketball people in China
Asian Games competitors for Chinese Taipei
Formosa Dreamers players
Formosa Taishin Dreamers players
Chinese Taipei men's national basketball team players
Dacin Tigers players
Super Basketball League players
P. League+ players